Panguipulli Formation is a sedimentary formation of Triassic age located in Los Ríos Region and southernmost Araucanía Region in south–central Chile. The formation is variously covered by Quaternary lavas in the east and Quaternary moraines, Holocene alluvium and colluvium in the west. The formation and make up possibly the remnants of an ancient lake and river system. The formation is named after the town of Panguipulli on the western edge of Panguipulli Lake. The formation has evidence of low grade metamorphism and is locally intruded by plutons of the North Patagonian Batholith that are of Jurassic, Cretaceous and Miocene age.

References 

Geologic formations of Chile
Triassic System of South America
Triassic Chile
Sandstone formations
Mudstone formations
Conglomerate formations
Geology of Araucanía Region
Geology of Los Ríos Region
Mapuche language